Mirów may refer to the following places in Poland:
 Mirów, Warsaw, part of the Wola district of Warsaw
 Mirów, a district of Częstochowa
 Mirów, a district of Gdańsk
 Mirów, a district of Pińczów
Mirów, Chrzanów County in Lesser Poland Voivodeship (south Poland)
Mirów, Przasnysz County in Masovian Voivodeship (east-central Poland)
Mirów, Szydłowiec County in Masovian Voivodeship (east-central Poland)
Mirów, Silesian Voivodeship (south Poland)